The following is a list of international organization leaders in 2014.

UN organizations

Political and economic organizations

Financial organizations

Sports organizations

Other organizations

See also
List of state leaders in 2014
List of religious leaders in 2014
List of international organization leaders in 2013
List of international organization leaders in 2015

References

2014
2014 in international relations
Lists of office-holders in 2014